Walsden is a large village in the civil parish of Todmorden in the Metropolitan Borough of Calderdale, West Yorkshire, England. 

It was historically partially administered in Lancashire (the Walsden Water as tributary to the Calder serving as the county boundary), and close to the modern boundary with Greater Manchester.

Overview

Walsden railway station, on the Leeds-Todmorden-Manchester line, originally opened in 1841 and re-opened 10 September 1990, having been closed for almost 30 years.

The canal and A6033 between the former Bird in'th Hand pub and the Bellholme football pitches was also the only place to be bombed in Todmorden during the Blitz; the blasts breached the Rochdale Canal and broke a water main on Rochdale Road.

Multiple small craters can still be picked out on both hillsides, one of which contains the Summit Tunnel trans-Pennine railway line, which may have been an alternative target for a raid primarily aimed at the Manchester area; its easterly Yorkshire end is less than ¼ mile away.

The road was quickly repaired, the canal was shored up with earth from the former floodplain of Walsden Water (which is why the pitches are above the natural ground level) and the whole bombing incident was hushed up.

Walsden was originally administered by Rochdale corporation in the county palatine of Lancashire, hence some of the local historical archives are held by Rochdale MBC.

The village sits wholly within West Yorkshire with boundaries to Greater Manchester (south by southwest) and Lancashire (west by northwest)

Although Walsden is the common name given to the area it is made up of numerous hamlets (as is commonplace to the region).

Warland, Bellhome, Bottomley, Lanebottom, Deanroyd, Bottoms, Allescholes, Birkswood, Ramsden, Henshaw, Hollins and Copprashouse are all part of what is now generally referred to as Walsden.

Governance
Walsden is a village in the civil parish of Todmorden and the Todmorden ward of Calderdale, a metropolitan borough within the ceremonial county of West Yorkshire in England.

Etymology
Walsden's name is of Anglo-Saxon origin meaning "Valley of Foreigner" or "Valley of he who is Foreign". Foreign refers to the Celtic Britons who lived in West Yorkshire at the time of the Anglo Saxon Petty Kingdoms. Thus, it has the same root as Wales and as Wallonia in Belgium. It has been said in the past that it comes from "Wolves' Den", this is dismissed as a folk etymology.

Religion
The Parish Church is St. Peter's (Church of England), originally constructed between 1846–48. The Grade II listed spire of 1864 is all that remains of the Victorian church, which was devastated by fire on 28th May 1948. The rest of the building was reconstructed and reconsecrated in 1956, so that the nave now has a number of mid-century architectural features. The church has an associated school nearby, Walsden St Peter's CE (VC) Primary School.

Sport
Walsden has a cricket club that plays in the major Lancashire Leagues.

Notable residents 
 Nobel physics award recipient Sir John Cockcroft was born and brought up here, living on Birks Lane.
 Former police officer Alan Godfrey lived in Bottomley for a period until the 2010s.

References

External links

Villages in West Yorkshire
Geography of Calderdale
Todmorden